Norristown is a census-designated place and unincorporated community in Emanuel County, Georgia, United States. Its population was 54 as of the 2020 census. Norristown has a post office with ZIP code 30447, which opened on May 8, 1878. U.S. Route 221 passes through the community.

Demographics

History
The Georgia General Assembly incorporated Norristown as a town in 1907. The town's municipal charter was repealed in 1995.

References

Former municipalities in Georgia (U.S. state)
Populated places in Emanuel County, Georgia
Census-designated places in Georgia (U.S. state)
Unincorporated communities in Georgia (U.S. state)
Populated places disestablished in 1995